Köseçobanlı is a town in Mersin Province, Turkey

Geography

The town is in rural area of Gülnar district which in turn is a part of Mersin Province. Köseçobanlı is on a high plateau of Toros Mountains, the average altitude being around

People

Like surrounding villages and towns,  origin of Köseçobanlı residents are mostly Yörüks (nomadic Oghuz Turks) who had migrated from Turkestan during Mongol invasions. The population is 2626 (as of 2012).

Economy

The main economic activity is agriculture. The main crops are cereals, apple and chickpea . The traditional livestock was goat. But cattle has replaced goats in order to protect forest around. Another business is beekeeping.

References

Populated places in Mersin Province
Towns in Turkey
Populated places in Gülnar District